The Rugby Players Ireland is the representative body for professional rugby players in Ireland. Founded in October 2001, its aims are to promote and protect the welfare of professional rugby players in Ireland. The Chief Executive Officer is Simon Keogh and Rob Kearney is its current chairman. Its headquarters are in Clonskeagh in Dublin.

Objectives
The associations objectives are:-
To promote and protect the welfare of its members, both during and after their careers.
To cater for the educational and welfare needs of its members, to ensure that they have sufficient preparation for the life after rugby.
To work in partnership with the IRFU to further the cause of Rugby Union in Ireland.
To be the representative mouthpiece for professional rugby players on issues of importance to the game.

Services
Rugby Players Ireland provides a Player Development Manager (PDM).  The five pillars of Rugby Players Ireland's Player Development Programme are 1) Education, Training & Skills, 2) Social Engagement, 3) Financial Management & Planning, 4) Player Wellbeing and 5) Career Advice & Guidance. Each PDM works closely with the players on an individual level to prepare them for the transition to life after professional rugby.

The association also acts as a negotiator between players and their employer.  They are involved with negotiating group contracts in areas such as match and win bonuses and act as a go-between in the event of disputes. In 2018, the remit of Rugby Players Ireland was extended to include the Irish 7s programme in addition to international women's players. This includes bringing industrial action if necessary.

History
In October 2001 Ireland's professional rugby players set up the Irish Rugby Union Players' Association.  Over 95% of all players with a contract with the IRFU joined the new body. Liam Toland and Peter McKenna were appointed Chairman and Secretary.

In 2003, the members of the association realised the need for a full-time employee and former Ireland International Niall Woods was appointed the first full-time Chief Executive Officer.

On 12 April 2017, the organization changed its name from the Irish Rugby Union Players Association (IRUPA) to Rugby Players Ireland.

Awards

Rugby Players Ireland has run the annual Rugby Players Ireland Awards dinner from 2002 which gives recognition to rugby players in a number of categories. The awards dinner is run to support the Rugby Players Ireland Foundation. The most prestigious award is the Players' Player of the Year award which is voted for by playing members of Rugby Players Ireland.

Players' Player of the Year winners

* Tommy Bowe was also awarded the 2010 WRPA Players' Player of the Year Award.

Other awards
Other awards include the Young Player of the Year award, Try of the Year and the Unsung Hero as well as the Hall of Fame.

List of Hall of Fame inductees
The Rugby Players Ireland Hall of Fame includes the following members:

Rugby Players Ireland Foundation
Rugby Players Ireland administers the injured players fund which provides support to players who are forced to retire from rugby due to illness or injury. The fund is reliant on individual and corporate donations. The Rugby Players Ireland annual awards dinner is also a major part of its fundraising activity. Following the 2010 Haiti earthquake, Rugby Players Ireland made a donation of €20,000 from the injured players fund to assist with relief efforts through aid agency Concern.

See also
 Rugby Players' Association (England)
 Rugby Union Players' Association (Australia)
 Welsh Rugby Players Association

References

External links
 

2001 establishments in Ireland
Sports organizations established in 2001
Rugby union players representative bodies